The Islamic Association of Teachers of Iran is an Iranian reformist teacher's political organization/labor union. Most members of the association are employees of Ministry of Education.

Members 
According to its official website, the union was established by Mohammad Ali Rajai, Mohammad Beheshti and Mohammad Javad Bahonar before the revolution.

Former MPs Goharolsharieh Dastgheib, Ateghe Sediqi, Morteza Katiraie, Abbas Duzduzani are members of the association. Former Minister of Education Hossein Mozaffar is also a member.

Current officeholders 

Parliament
 Davoud Mohammadi (Tehran, Rey, Shemiranat and Eslamshahr)
City Council
 Hassan Khalilabadi (Tehran)
 Ramezanali Feyzi (Mashhad)

See also
:Category:Islamic Association of Teachers of Iran politicians
Iranian Teachers' Trade Association

References

Reformist political groups in Iran
Political parties established in 1977
1977 establishments in Iran
Trade unions established in 1977
Trade unions in Iran
Education trade unions